Ferteth of Strathearn ( 1160), sometimes referred to as Ferchar or Ferquhard, is the second-known earl or mormaer of Strathearn, a region in central Scotland.

Ferteth was the son of his predecessor Malise I, and Rosabella Forteith. His name likely derives from the Gaelic Fer Téid, "Teith Man". He first appears in history in 1160, when he came to the Parliament at Perth. On this occasion he, with the help of five other earls, besieged King Malcolm in Perth Castle. The reason for this is not clear, but it may have been a protest against Malcolm's friendship with Henry II of England, which they believed might lead to Scotland becoming an English vassal. The king and the earls were later reconciled, and Earl Ferteth was not punished for his actions.

Ferteth took a great interest in ecclesiastical affairs, and it was largely due to his influence that Strathearn was made a separate diocese, headed by the Bishops of Dunblane. He died in 1171, having married a woman named Ethen, of unknown parentage. Ferteth and Ethen had two sons and a daughter:
 Gille-Brigte (Gilbert)
 Malise, who held Muthil, Ogilvy, Kincardine, Rossie and other lands in Perthshire, and married Ada, illegitimate daughter of David, Earl of Huntingdon
 Christian, who married Sir Walter Olifard, Justiciar of the Lothians and son of Sir David Olifard.

Bibliography
Anderson, Rev'd John, "The Ancient Earls of Strathearn", in Sir James Balfour Paul (ed.) The Scots Peerage, Volume VIII, (Edinburgh, 1911), pp. 240-1
 Neville, Cynthia J., Native Lordship in Medieval Scotland: The Earldoms of Strathearn and Lennox, c. 1140–1365, (Portland & Dublin, 2005)

External links
Entry for Ferteth (Fer Téid) on POMS

12th-century deaths
People from Perth and Kinross
Year of birth unknown
Mormaers of Strathearn
12th-century mormaers